Rimer is an unincorporated community in western Sugar Creek Township, Putnam County, Ohio, United States.  It lies along State Route 189 between Fort Jennings and Vaughnsville.

History
Rimer was originally called Roxburg, and under the latter name was laid out in 1881. The present name is for D. P. Rimer, the original owner of the town site. A post office called Rimer was in operation from 1882 until 1916.

References

Unincorporated communities in Putnam County, Ohio
Unincorporated communities in Ohio